Chernolagutinsky is a rural locality (a khutor) and the administrative center of Chernorechenskoye Rural Settlement, Kikvidzensky District, Volgograd Oblast, Russia. The population was 818 as of 2010. There are 9 streets.

Geography 
Chernolagutinsky is located on Khopyorsko-Buzulukskaya plain, on the left bank of the Chyornaya River, 32 km southeast of Preobrazhenskaya (the district's administrative centre) by road. Besov is the nearest rural locality.

References 

Rural localities in Kikvidzensky District